Trinidad is the larger and more populous of the two major islands of Trinidad and Tobago. It is often referred to as the southernmost island in the West Indies.

Name
Christopher Columbus renamed it  ('The Island of the Trinity'), fulfilling a vow he had made before setting out on his third voyage. This has since been shortened to Trinidad.

History

Caribs and Arawaks lived in Trinidad long before Christopher Columbus encountered the islands on his third voyage on 31 July 1498. The island remained Spanish until 1797, but it was largely settled by French colonists from the French Caribbean, especially Martinique. In 1889 the two islands became a single British Crown colony. Trinidad and Tobago was granted self-governance in 1958 and independence from the United Kingdom in August 1962, and became a republic in August 1976.

Geography
Major landforms include the hills of the Northern, Central and Southern Ranges (Dinah ranges), the Caroni, Nariva and Oropouche Swamps, and the Caroni and Naparima Plains. Major river systems include the Caroni, North and South Oropouche and Ortoire Rivers. There are many other natural landforms such as beaches and waterfalls. 
Trinidad has two seasons per the calendar year: the rainy season and the dry season. El Cerro del Aripo, at 940 metres (3,084 ft), is the highest point in Trinidad. It is part of the Aripo Massif and is located in the Northern Range on the island, northeast of the town of Arima.

Demographics

As of the 2011 Trinidad and Tobago Census, the population was 35.43% Indian, 34.22% African, 7.66% mixed African and East Indian, and 15.16% other mixed. Venezuela has also had a great impact on Trinidad's culture, such as introducing the music style parang to the island. Many groups overlap. For example, a "Dougla" is a person of African and East Indian descent who may identify as being part of either group.

Culture

There are multiple festivals on Trinidad, featuring the music of the Caribbean and the steelpan (which originated on Trinidad and is the country's national instrument); These festivals include the multi-national, pre-Lenten Carnivál, J'ouvert, and Panorama, the national steelpan competition. 

In addition to the traditional Christian holidays and official public days (such as Boxing Day, Christmas, Easter Sunday, Easter Monday, Emancipation Day, Good Friday, Independence Day, Labour Day, New Year’s Day, and Republic Day) in Trinidad, the island nation also celebrates a significant percentage of its population’s Indian ancestry (of both Hindu and Muslim backgrounds), with officially-recognised holidays such as Divali, Dussehra, Eid al-Fitr, Ganesh Chaturthi, Indian Arrival Day, Krishna Janmashtami, Maha Shivaratri, Navaratri, and Phagwah. Sites of cultural or religious significance include Mount Saint Benedict and the Temple in the Sea.

Zoology

The island of Trinidad has a rich biodiversity. The fauna is overwhelmingly of South American origin. There are about 100 species of mammals including the Guyanese red howler monkey, the collared peccary, the red brocket deer, the ocelot and about 70 species of bats. There are over 400 species of birds including the endemic Trinidad piping-guan. Reptiles are well represented, with about 92 recorded species including the largest species of snake in the world, the green anaconda, the spectacled caiman, and one of the largest lizards in the Americas, the green iguana. Trinidad is also the largest leatherback turtle nesting site in the western hemisphere; they nest on Trinidad's eastern and northern beaches. There are 37 recorded frog species, including the tiny El Tucuche golden tree frog, Trinidad poison frog, and the more widespread huge cane toad. About 43 species of freshwater fish are known from Trinidad, including the well known guppy. It is estimated that there are at least 80,000 arthropods, and at least 600 species of butterflies.

Economy
The economy of Trinidad and Tobago is diversified, based to a large extent on oil and natural gas. It is one of the leading gas-based export centers in the world, being one of the top five exporters of liquefied natural gas and the largest onshore natural gas well was recently discovered in southern Trinidad. This has allowed Trinidad to capitalize on the biggest mineral reserves within its territories. It is an oil-rich country and stable economically.

Geology

The Venezuela Tertiary Basin is a subsidence basin formed between the Caribbean and South American plates, and is bounded on the north by the coast ranges of Venezuela and the Northern Range of Trinidad, and bounded on the south by the Guayana Shield. This Guayana shield supplied fine-grained clastic sediments, which with the subsidence, formed a regional negative gravity anomaly and growth faults. Oil and gas discoveries from the Pliocene Moruga Group include Teak (1968), Samaan (1971), Poui (1972) and Galeota.

The Northern Range is an Upper Jurassic-Lower Cretaceous range of metamorphic rocks striking east and dipping south.  The range's southern boundary is marked by a fault extending from the El Pilar Fault System in Venezuela.  South of this fault is the Northern Basin, or Caroni Syncline, consisting of Tertiary sedimentary rocks unconformably overlying Jurassic and Cretaceous sedimentary rocks.  South of this basin is the Central Range, consisting of Upper Tertiary sedimentary rocks lying unconformably atop Lower Eocene and Paleocene rocks. South of this range is the Naparima Plain, a thrust belt of Oligocene and Lower Tertiary beds.  

Hydrocarbon bearing anticlines include those associated with Pitch Lake, Forest Reserve, Point Fortin, Penal, Barrackpore, and Balata Fields.  The Los Bajos Fault is a wrench fault, with Lower Pliocene displacement of 6.51 miles, bordered on the north by the Siparia syncline, and on the south by the Erin syncline.  Finally, the Southern Range consists of anticlinal folds, including the Rock Dome-Herrera anticline and the Moruga-West Field. East of this Rock Dome are en echelon folds containing the Lizard Springs Field.  South of these folds is another fold trend containing the Moruga-East, Guayaguayare, Beach, and Galeota Fields.  South of the Morne Diablo-Quinam Erin Field westward is a strongly folded anticline associated with shale diapirism, which extends west southwestward to the Pedernales Field in southeast Venezuela.  The northeast portion of the Southern Range separates into a northern trend containing the Lizard Springs, Navette, and Mayaro Fields, while the southern trend contains the Beach Field.

Recreation
Trinidad is considered one of the best places in the world to catch Atlantic tarpon.

See also

 Culture of Trinidad and Tobago
 Hinduism in Trinidad and Tobago
 Islam in Trinidad and Tobago
 Music of Trinidad and Tobago
 Religion in Trinidad and Tobago
 Trinidad and Tobago literature
 Trinidad and Tobago cuisine

References

Sources
  Bane, S.C., and Chanpong, R.R. (1980) "Geology and Development of the Teak Oil Field, Trinidad, West Indies", in Giant Oil and Gas Fields of the Decade: 1968–1978, AAPG Memoir 30, Tulsa: American Association of Petroleum Geologists, .

External links

 
 
 Gotrinidadandtobago.com: Trinidad and Tobago tourism website

 01
Islands of Trinidad and Tobago
Windward Islands
Former Spanish colonies
Spanish West Indies
1530 establishments in the Spanish West Indies
1797 disestablishments in the Spanish West Indies
1797 establishments in the British Empire